Tu'iono Siosiua "Josh" Liava'a (10 May 1948 – 13 July 2014) was a Tongan-born rugby league player who represented New Zealand in the 1975 World Cup.

Playing career
A Northcote Tigers player in the Auckland Rugby League competition, Liava'a played for Auckland and in 1975 was picked in the New Zealand national rugby league team for the 1975 World Cup.

In 1977 Liava'a played for New Zealand Māori in the Pacific Cup.

Personal life
Liava'a was a member of the New Zealand Police. He was a detective and later a uniform branch sergeant. He completed a Diploma of Criminology at Auckland University. During the early 1980's, he and fellow police officer; inspector Ross Meurant, established a private security company which they registered in the names of their wives, to avoid being "Court Martialed" for conflicts of interests. Maiden Security operated for 5 years until Meurant entered parliament as an MP in 1987.

After leaving the police, Liava'a ran a nightclub in Sydney.

Liava'a was married several times, including to:
Princess Siuilikutapu of Tonga, a niece of Tongan monarch Tāufaʻāhau Tupou IV; they married in November 1969. The king was reportedly furious and lured the princess back to Tonga, where she was kept under palace arrest. The marriage was annulled by royal decree.
Levaai Nancy Wolfgramm, a cousin of the Olympic silver medallist boxer Paea Wolfgramm. The couple married in 1971.

In the 1980s Liava'a reportedly had an affair with Tāufaʻāhau Tupou IV's only daughter, Princess Pilolevu Tuita.

He died from a gunshot in Hawaii on 13 July 2014.

References

1948 births
2014 deaths
Tongan rugby league players
New Zealand Māori rugby league team players
New Zealand national rugby league team players
Tongan emigrants to New Zealand
Northcote Tigers players
Auckland rugby league team players
New Zealand police officers
Rugby league second-rows